Narutowicz is a Polish surname. Notable people with the surname include:

 Gabriel Narutowicz (1865-1922), president of Poland
 Joanna Narutowicz (1868-1948), wife of Stanislaw
 Stanisław Narutowicz (1862-1932), brother of Gabriel, Polish-Lithuanian activist
 Kazimierz Narutowicz (1904-1987), son of Stanisław and Joanna, Polish-Lithuanian activist

Polish-language surnames